Stegania trimaculata, the Dorset cream wave, is a moth of the family Geometridae. It is found throughout Europe, mainly in Southern Europe, but its range has expanded in recent years.

The wingspan is 26–28 mm. The length of the forewings is 10–13 mm. The moth flies in two generations from May to September .

The larvae feed on various species of poplar.

Notes
  The flight season refers to Belgium and The Netherlands. This may vary in other parts of the range.

External links
 
 Dorset cream wave on UKmoths
 BioLib
 Lepiforum.de
 Vlindernet.nl 

Abraxini
Moths described in 1789
Moths of Europe
Moths of Asia
Taxa named by Charles Joseph Devillers